William McCulloch may refer to:

William Moore McCulloch (1901–1980), American politician (US Representative from Ohio)
William McCulloch (Australian politician) (1832–1909)
Willie McCulloch (born 1973), Scottish footballer
Willie McCulloch (footballer, born 1927) (1927–2013), Scottish footballer
Willie McCulloch (footballer, born 1948) (born 1948), Scottish footballer